Revel is a commune in the Haute-Garonne department in southwestern France.

Geography

Location
Other notable nearby towns are Carcassonne and Castelnaudary to the south, Castres to the east, and Albi to the northeast.

Climate

Revel has a humid subtropical climate (Köppen climate classification Cfa).

Population

The inhabitants of the commune are known as Revélois and Revéloises.

History
Revel was one of the last bastide towns to be chartered.  Founded as a royal bastide by the king's seneschal from Toulouse, Agot de Baux, on 8 June 1342, it was originally an open town on a featureless plain. During the Hundred Years' War, the townspeople successfully lobbied for the right to protect themselves and built a kilometre of ramparts six metres high and four gates at the points of the compass.

Sights
The most notable physical feature of Revel is its central square, partially covered by a 14th-century roof, supported by wooden pillars and topped by a distinctive bell-tower. Originally, the marketplace was erected in the fourteenth century. In 1829, a fire destroyed the building. Five years later, it was restored, accruing its recent form with the addition of the cupola and a clock. Every Saturday morning, a market is held in the square and surrounding streets in which a variety of goods, but especially food and clothing, are for sale.

Another distinctive building is the large, Gothic-style town church of Notre-Dame, just south of the central square.

Just south of Revel, where the land begins to slope upwards into the Montagne Noire regional park, is the Lac de Saint-Ferréol, a man-made lake dating from the seventeenth century which is linked to and supplies water to the Canal du Midi. For some time, the lake has been enjoyed by local residents and tourists as a place for walking, sunbathing, picnicking etc. A number of hotels, cafés, restaurants and private homes can be found close to the north shore of the lake.

Economy
Revel is arguably best known for two products: furniture, and a mint liqueur named Get 27, which has been manufactured in the town since the 18th century. Cabinet-making is a specialty of the area, and many cabinet makers are trained at the local lycée, which specialises in technical training, and admits pupils from across the region on a residential (boarding) basis during the week. Furniture shops and warehouses are a feature of Revel and the surrounding area.

Revel's lycée is located on the east side of the town, on the Route de Sorèze, and is named after Vincent Auriol (1884-1966), the socialist politician who was born in the town and who was the first President of the Fourth Republic of France between 1947 and  1954.

Transportation
Public transport to and from Revel is sparse. At one time, Revel was linked to Toulouse by rail, but the only remnant of this facility is the derelict railway station to the north-west of  the town. The nearest town with a rail link (to Toulouse or the south coast) is Castelnaudary. A coach service between Revel and Toulouse runs on an infrequent basis.

Media

See also
Communes of the Haute-Garonne department

References

Communes of Haute-Garonne
Languedoc